David Constable may refer to:

David Constable (artist) (born 1939), British candlemaker and author
David Constable (businessman), Canadian engineer and businessman